Trebinje is a city and municipality located in the Republika Srpska entity of Bosnia and Herzegovina. It is the southernmost city in Bosnia and Herzegovina and is situated on the banks of Trebišnjica river in the region of East Herzegovina. As of 2013, it has a population of 31,433 inhabitants. The city's old town quarter dates to the 18th-century Ottoman period, and includes the Arslanagić Bridge, also known as Perovića Bridge.

Geography

Physical geography 
There are several mills along the river, as well as several bridges, including three in the city of Trebinje itself, as well as a historic Ottoman Arslanagić Bridge nearby. The river is heavily exploited for hydro-electric energy. After it passes through the Popovo Polje area southwest of the city, the river – which always floods in the winter – naturally runs underground to the Adriatic, near Dubrovnik. Trebinje is known as "the city of the sun and platan trees", and it is said to be one of the most beautiful cities in Bosnia and Herzegovina. The city is the economic and cultural center of the region of East Herzegovina.

Political geography 
The Trebinje municipality is located in the most southern part of Republika Srpska and the municipalities of Bileća, Ljubinje and Ravno  in Herzegovina-Neretva Canton of the Federation of Bosnia and Herzegovina. The Trebinje municipality has an area of 904 km2 and makes up 3,68% of the total territory of the Republic of Srpska.

Climate
Trebinje experiences a Humid subtropical climate (Cfa) with heavy precipitation, typical of the southern Adriatic coastal areas.

History

Middle Ages

De Administrando Imperio by Constantine VII (913–959) mentioned Travunija (Τερβουνια). Serbian Prince Vlastimir (r. 830–51) married his daughter to Krajina, the son of Beloje, and that family became hereditary rulers of Travunija. By 1040 Stefan Vojislav's state stretched in the coastal region from Ston in the north, down to his capital, Skadar, set up along the southern banks of the Skadar Lake, with other courts set up in Trebinje, Kotor and Bar.

The town commanded the road from Ragusa to Constantinople, which was traversed in 1096 by Raymond IV of Toulouse and his crusaders. Trebinje diocese has its episcopal seat in Polje near Trebinje.   At the end of the 12th century Stefan Nemanja conquered provinces that include Trebinje. Under the name of Tribunia or Travunja it belonged to the Serbian Empire until 1355. Trebinje became a part of the expanded medieval Bosnian state under Tvrtko I in 1373. There is a medieval tower in Gornje Police whose construction is often attributed to Vuk Branković. The old Tvrdoš Monastery dates back to the 15th century.

In 1482, together with the rest of Herzegovina (see: Herzog Stjepan Vukčić Kosača), the town was captured by the Ottoman Empire. The Old Town-Kastel was built by the Ottomans on the location of the medieval fortress of Ban Vir, on the western bank of the Trebišnjica River. The city walls, the Old Town square, and two mosques were built in the beginning of the 18th century by the Resulbegović family. The Arslanagić Bridge is one of the most attractive Ottoman-era bridges in Bosnia and Herzegovina. It has two large and two small semicircular arches.

Among noble families in the Trebinje region mentioned in Ragusan documents were Ljubibratić, Starčić, Popović, Krasomirić, Preljubović, Poznanović, Dragančić, Kobiljačić, Paštrović, Zemljić and Stanjević.

Ottoman era
The burning of Saint Sava's remains after the Banat Uprising provoked the Serbs in other regions to revolt against the Ottomans. Grdan, the vojvoda of Nikšić, organized revolt with Serbian Patriarch Jovan Kantul. From 1596, the center of anti-Ottoman activity in Herzegovina was the Tvrdoš Monastery in Trebinje, where Metropolitan Visarion was seated. In 1596, the uprising broke out in Bjelopavlići, then spread to Drobnjaci, Nikšić, Piva and Gacko (see Serb Uprising of 1596–97). The rebels were defeated at the field of Gacko. It ultimately failed due to lack of foreign support.

The hajduks in Herzegovina had in March 1655 carried out one of their greatest operations, raiding Trebinje, taking many slaves and carrying with them out much loot.

On 26 November 1716, Austrian general Nastić with 400 soldiers and  500 hajduks attacked Trebinje, but did not take it over. A combined Austro-Venetian-Hajduk force of 7,000 stood before the Trebinje walls, defended by 1,000 Ottomans. The Ottomans were busy near Belgrade and with hajduk attacks towards Mostar, and were thus unable to reinforce Trebinje. The conquest of Trebinje and Popovo field were given up to fight in Montenegro. The Venetians took over Hutovo and Popovo, where they immediately recruited militarily from the population.

Turkish rule lasted from 1466. until 1878. The Trebinje region suffered especially in the 16th century, mostly from the hand of uskoks of Senj and various hajduk bands. The calmer period during the Turkish rule was the 18th century. The elders from Trebinje, together with the people of Nikšić, planned a great uprising in the summer of 1805, under the influence of the First Serbian Uprising. Their project was suppressed by the Turkish pasha and probably with the help from the Slavic Muslims.

The Christians of Trebinje, together with the Montenegrins, fought against Napoleon's troops and in several conflicts they managed to defeat the French troops, such as the knife fight which took place on October 2–3, 1806 leaving several thousands of French soldiers dead, after which the French withdrew for a while.

Notable participants in the Herzegovina Uprising (1852–62) from Trebinje include Mićo Ljubibratić.

During the Herzegovina Uprising (1875–77), the Bileća and Trebinje region was led by serdar Todor Mujičić, Gligor Milićević, Vasilj Svorcan and Sava Jakšić.

Austria-Hungary

With the Austro-Hungarian occupation of Bosnia and Herzegovina, many reforms took place. New administrative division was introduced and a large number of Austro-Hungarian troops were located in Trebinje, which was seen as a city of strategic value and position. No factories or bigger investments were made in Trebinje during the AU rule.

After the Assassination of Archduke Franz Ferdinand Croat-Muslim volunteer corps (German: Schutzcorp) terrorized Serb civilians of Bogojevići and other villages in Trebinje, which resulted in 83 children killed and 85 adults hanged. Those and related actions resulted in migrations of the local population to Serbia.

During the period of Austro-Hungarian administration (1878–1918), several fortifications were built on the surrounding hills, and there was a garrison based in the town. The imperial administrators also modernized the town, expanding it westwards, building the present main street, as well as several squares, parks, schools, tobacco plantations, etc.

SFR Yugoslavia (1945–92)

Trebinje grew rapidly in the era of Josip Broz Tito's Socialist Federal Republic of Yugoslavia between 1945 and 1980. It especially developed its hydroelectric potential with dams, artificial lakes, tunnels, and hydroelectric plants. This industrial development brought a large increase in the urban population of Trebinje.

Bosnian War (1992–95)
Trebinje was the largest town in Serb-held eastern Herzegovina during the Bosnian War. It was controlled by Bosnian Serb forces from the fall of 1991, and was used as a major command and artillery base by Yugoslav People's Army (JNA) troops besieging the Croatian town of Dubrovnik. In 1992 Trebinje was declared the capital of the self-proclaimed Serbian Autonomous Region of Herzegovina. Bosniak residents were subsequently conscripted to fight with the JNA and if refused they were executed, and thus they fled the region. Ten of the town's mosques were razed to the ground during the war.

Settlements 
Trebinje is one of two municipalities created from the former Yugoslav municipality of Trebinje of the 1991 census, the other being Ravno in the Federation of Bosnia and Herzegovina. As of 2018, it has a total of 178 settlements that comprise it (including city proper area of Trebinje):

 Aranđelovo
 Arbanaška
 Arslanagića Most
 Baonine
 Begović Kula
 Bihovo
 Bijelač
 Bijograd
 Bioci
 Bodiroge
 Bogojević Selo
 Borlovići
 Brani Do
 Brova
 Budoši
 Bugovina
 Cerovac
 Čvarići
 Desin Selo
 Diklići
 Djedići, Do
 Dobromani
 Dodanovići
 Dolovi
 Domaševo
 Donja Kočela
 Donje Čičevo
 Donje Grančarevo
 Donje Vrbno
 Donji Orahovac
 Dračevo
 Dražin Do
 Drijenjani
 Dubljani
 Dubočani
 Duži
 Glavinići
 Gojšina
 Gola Glavica
 Gomiljani
 Gornja Kočela
 Gornje Čičevo
 Gornje Grančarevo
 Gornje Vrbno
 Gornji Orovac
 Grab
 Grbeši
 Grbići
 Grkavci
 Grmljani
 Hum
 Janjač
 Jasen
 Jasenica Lug
 Jazina
 Jušići
 Klikovići
 Klobuk
 Konjsko
 Korlati
 Kotezi
 Kovačina
 Kraj
 Krajkovići
 Kremeni Do
 Krnjevići
 Kučići
 Kunja Glavica
 Kutina
 Lapja
 Lastva
 Lokvice
 Lomači
 Lug
 Lušnica
 Ljekova
 Ljubovo
 Marić Međine
 Mesari
 Mionići
 Morče
 Mosko
 Mrkonjići
 Mrnjići
 Necvijeće
 Nevada
 Nikontovići
 Ograde
 Orašje Popovo
 Orašje Površ
 Orašje Zubci
 Parojska Njiva
 Petrovići
 Pijavice
 Podosoje
 Podstrašivica
 Podštirovnik
 Podvori
 Poljice Čičevo
 Poljice Popovo
 Prhinje Pridvorci
 Prosjek
 Rapti Bobani
 Rapti Zupci
 Rasovac
 Sedlari
 Skočigrm
 Staro Slano
 Strujići
 Šarani
 Šćenica Ljubomir
 Taleža
 Todorići
 Trebijovi
 Tuli
 Tulje
 Turani
 Turica
 Turmenti
 Tvrdoš
 Ubla
 Ugarci
 Ukšići
 Uskoplje
 Uvjeća
 Veličani
 Velja Gora
 Vladušići
 Vlaka
 Vlasače
 Vlaška
 Volujac
 Vrpolje Ljubomir
 Vrpolje Zagora
 Vučija
 Zagora
 Zavala
 Zgonjevo
 Žakovo
 Ždrijelovići
 Željevo
 Župa

Demographics
According to the 2013 census results, the city of Trebinje has 31,433 inhabitants.

Population

Ethnic composition

Culture

The Serbian Orthodox church in Trebinje, Saborna Crkva, was built between 1888 and 1908. The Hercegovačka Gračanica monastery, a loose copy of the Gračanica monastery in Kosovo, was completed in 2000. The churches are located above the city, on the historic Crkvina Hill. The 15th-century Tvrdoš monastery is located two kilometres south-west of Trebinje, including a church which dates back to late antiquity. There is also the Roman Catholic Cathedral of the Birth of Mary in the town centre, as well as monuments dedicated to acclaimed poets Njegoš and Jovan Dučić (who was from the town). The Osman-Paša Resulbegović mosque, located in the Old Town, was originally built in 1726 and fully renovated in 2005. The Old Town walls are well preserved. The Arslanagić Bridge (1574) is located 1 km north of the town center.

Sports
The local football club, FK Leotar Trebinje, plays in the Premier League of Bosnia and Herzegovina.

Economy
The headquarters of Elektroprivreda Republike Srpske, which is the largest employer in Republika Srpska (as of 2016), is located in Trebinje. As of 2016, most of its economy is based on services.

The following table gives a preview of total number of registered people employed in legal entities per their core activity (as of 2018):

Transportation

Airport project 
In late 2009 the Government of Republika Srpska approved funding for the Trebinje airport project. The airport was intended to serve as a low cost alternative to Dubrovnik. The airport was intended to be operational in 2010 and then delayed till 2011. The terminal was planned to handle 260,000 passengers annually. This is despite the airport not having been built. Over 820,000 euros have been spent on the project, mostly on documentation.

The plan for the Trebinje airport was resurrected in 2020 in the context of the RS-Serbia relations.
The new airport will be built in the village of Mionići, some ten kilometres from Trebinje. It will feature a 3.5-kilometre runway, taxiways totalling 4.5 kilometres and a 7.000 square metre terminal building. The airport shall be in the full ownership of the Republic of Serbia, which will invest over EUR 50 million in its construction. Mladen Stanković, from the Niš Airport, was appointed head of the new airport management company. Works will be carried out by a consortium of Herzegovinian construction companies.
In September 2020, the RS passed a law on the special procedure of expropriation for the construction of the airport in Trebinje. First flights are expected by 2022, thought works at the airport will continue for up to 4 years.

Notable people

Mićo Ljubibratić, voivode
Asmir Begović, football goalkeeper
Beba Selimović, sevdalinka singer
Boris Savović, basketball player
Branislav Krunić, footballer
Dzeny, Bosnian-Swedish singer/songwriter
Ivana Ninković, Olympic swimmer
Nataša Ninković, Serbian actress
Jovan Deretić, historian
Jovan Dučić, poet and diplomat
Luka Ćelović, businessman and philanthropist
Nebojša Glogovac, Serbian actor
Uroš Đerić, footballer
Semjon Milošević, football player
Igor Joksimović, footballer
Siniša Mulina, footballer
Srđan Aleksić, amateur actor
Vladimir Gudelj, footballer
Arnela Odžaković, karateka
Vladimir Radmanović, Serbian NBA player, World champion
Sabahudin Bilalović, basketball player
Bogić Vučković, rebel leader
Mijat Gaćinović, Serbian football player, World U-20 and European U-19 champion
Marko Mihojević, footballer
Tijana Bošković, Serbian volleyball player, World and European champion, silver medalist at the 2016 Summer Olympics
Momčilo Mrkaić, footballer

Gallery

References

Sources

External links

 
 Trebinje Live portal
 eTrebinje portal
 Trebinje Danas portal

 
Cities and towns in Republika Srpska
Popovo Polje